Burim-dong (부림동, 富林洞) is neighborhood of Dongan district in the city of Anyang, Gyeonggi Province, South Korea.

External links
 Burim-dong 

Dongan-gu
Neighbourhoods in Anyang, Gyeonggi